Senator Hubbell may refer to:

Alrick Hubbell (1801–1877), New York State Senate
Don Lorenzo Hubbell (1853–1930), Arizona State Senate
James Randolph Hubbell (1824–1890), Ohio State Senate
Jay Abel Hubbell (1829–1900), Michigan State Senate